The 1932 United States presidential election in Minnesota took place on November 8, 1932 as part of the 1932 United States presidential election. Voters chose 11 electors, or representatives to the Electoral College, who voted for president and vice president.

Democrat Franklin D. Roosevelt became the first Democrat to ever carry Minnesota in a presidential election, taking 59.9% of the state's vote to incumbent Republican President Herbert Hoover's 36.3%, a margin of victory of 23.62% and 236,847 votes. Roosevelt won the national election in a landslide, taking 472 electoral votes and winning the national popular vote by 17.76%, Despite a history of overwhelming Republican dominance, Minnesota weighed in in this election as 5.86 percentage points more Democratic than the nation at-large.

This significant shift would foreshadow a national electoral realignment. The election of 1932, the first held since the Wall Street Crash of 1929, effectively marked the end of the Republican-dominated Fourth Party System, and the beginning of the Fifth Party System. This led to the dominance of the New Deal Coalition in presidential politics until 1968. Leading up to this election, the state's 1930 gubernatorial election, in which Farmer-Labor candidate Floyd B. Olson won the governorship by a landslide margin, was considered an indicator of the GOP's poor prospects in 1932. Throughout most of the 1930s, Roosevelt would dominate presidential politics in Minnesota, while Olson and the Farmer-Laborites tended to dominate state politics. The eventual cooperation between the Minnesota Farmer-Labor Party and the Democratic Party, fostered by Olson and Roosevelt, would lead to the establishment of the Minnesota Democratic-Farmer-Labor Party in 1944.

This was also only the second time since statehood that the state did not support the Republican candidate, the first being when it backed Progressive Party candidate Theodore Roosevelt in 1912. Minnesota has since voted Democratic in every presidential election except 1952, 1956, and 1972, all of which were national Republican landslides. , this is the last election in which Lake County voted for a Republican presidential candidate (incidentally it was the only county to vote Republican in this election) and the last election in which Carver County and Otter Tail County voted for a Democratic candidate.

Results

Results by county

See also
 United States presidential elections in Minnesota

References

1932
Min
1932 Minnesota elections